The Baffler is an American magazine of cultural, political, and business analysis.  Established in 1988 by editors Thomas Frank and Keith White, it was headquartered in Chicago, Illinois, until 2010, when it moved to Cambridge, Massachusetts.  In 2016, it moved its headquarters to New York City. The first incarnation of The Baffler had up to 12,000 subscribers.

As of 2016, the magazine and its collections of essays are distributed through bookstores in the United States, Canada, and the United Kingdom.

History
The magazine was first published by Greg Lane. Its motto was "the journal that blunts the cutting edge."  
It became known for critiquing "business culture and the culture business" and for having exposed the grunge speak hoax perpetrated on The New York Times.  
One famous and much-republished article, "The Problem with Music" by Steve Albini, exposed the inner workings of the music business during the indie rock heyday.

The magazine is credited with having helped launch the careers of several writers, including founding editor Thomas Frank, Ana Marie Cox, and Rick Perlstein.

Issues
The magazine published sporadically, first once a year then slightly more often, but that slowed down after the Chicago office of The Baffler was destroyed in a fire on April 25, 2001. Publishing became more regular and frequent after its relaunch and move to Cambridge in 2011. Timeline of publication:

The Baffler is sold through many different distribution channels, both as a book and as a magazine; in addition to the publication's ISSN, all but the earliest issues have an individual ISBN.

Relaunch and move
In 2009, founding editor Thomas Frank decided to revive the magazine. It was relaunched with Volume 2, Issue 1 (#18) in 2010, with a new publisher, editors, and design.

In 2011, The Baffler moved its headquarters to Cambridge, and John Summers took over as editor. The magazine signed a publishing contract with the MIT Press, and after another redesign, began publishing three times a year.  
In 2014, it ended that contract and brought publishing operations in house. In 2016, the magazine changed to a quarterly schedule and moved its headquarters to New York City. Summers left in 2016 and Chris Lehmann took over the editorship of the journal. In 2019, Lehmann departed for The New Republic, and Jonathon Sturgeon became editor in chief.

The Baffler has also organized literary events and debates with its contributing editors. In 2014, Peter Thiel, the co-founder of PayPal, and David Graeber, an anarchistic anthropologist and The Baffler's contributing editor, publicly debated the future of technology.

In 2017, The Baffler and CTXT, a Spanish independent online publication, began a collaborative editorial agreement.

Collections and books
In addition to the magazine, The Baffler has published a few collections of its essays and other writings.

 Commodify Your Dissent: Salvos from The Baffler. Edited by Thomas Frank and Matt Weiland. Norton, 1997. 
 Boob Jubilee: The Cultural Politics of the New Economy (Salvos from The Baffler). Edited by Thomas Frank and David Mulcahey. Norton, 2003. 
 Cotton Tenants: Three Families.  Edited by John Summers. Melville House, 2012.  Excerpts from a lost manuscript on Alabama tenant farmers by the writer James Agee.   
 No Future For You: Salvos from The Baffler. Edited by John Summers, Chris Lehmann and Thomas Frank. MIT Press, 2014.

Podcasts
The Baffler has previously hosted the podcasts Whale Vomit, by Amber A'Lee Frost and Sam Kriss; News from Nowhere, by Corey Pein; and The Nostalgia Trap, by David Parsons.

Notes

References

External links
 
 Excerpts from The Baffler at the Internet Archive (requires JavaScript for navigation)

1988 establishments in Virginia
Alternative magazines
Literary magazines published in the United States
Quarterly magazines published in the United States
Magazines established in 1988
Magazines published in Chicago
Magazines published in Boston
Magazines published in Virginia
Mass media in Charlottesville, Virginia
MIT Press